Snoqualmie Bog Natural Area Preserve in King County, Washington, is part of the Washington Natural Areas Program. It preserves a sphagnum moss bog now rare in the Puget Sound basin, as well as a small strip of old-growth forest.

References

Washington Natural Areas Program
Protected areas of King County, Washington
Landforms of King County, Washington
Bogs of Washington (state)